Buccaneer 28 was a trailerable trimaran sailboat designed by Lock Crowther. It featured an auxiliary 9HP outboard motor.

See also
 List of multihulls

References

Trimarans
Boats designed by Lock Crowther